St. Mary the Consoler at Tiburtino is a Roman Catholic titular parish church in Rome. It is located in Piazza Santa Maria Consolatrice, within the quartiere Tiburtino.

List of Cardinal Priests 
Jérôme Rakotomalala, O.M.I. (1969-1975)
Joseph Ratzinger (1977-1993)
Ricardo María Carles Gordó (1994-2013)
Philippe Ouédraogo (since 2014)

External links
Entry at Cathopedia.org

20th-century Roman Catholic church buildings in Italy
Roman Catholic churches completed in 1945
Maria Consolatrice al Tiburtino
Rome Q. VI Tiburtino